A Mont Blanc (or Mont-Blanc aux marrons) is a dessert of sweetened chestnut purée in the form of vermicelli, topped with whipped cream. It was created in nineteenth-century Paris. The name comes from Mont Blanc, as the dish resembles a snow-capped mountain.

Summary

Mont Blanc has been an autumn and winter favorite at many Parisian pâtisseries, notably the Parisian tea shop Angelina, where it has been a specialty since it opened in 1903. For a long time considered old-fashioned and heavy, it has become newly popular in the 2010s in a lighter form at trendy shops like Pierre Hermé, with many variations.

Mont Blanc is popular in France, Italy, Hong Kong, Shanghai, Japan, Slovakia, Switzerland, Hungary, and northwestern Romania.

History
Chestnut purées have a long history as a soup, porridge, or side dish for meats, especially in regions where chestnuts are a staple food. However, these dishes are not desserts, and are not served with whipped cream. Even a Swiss or German recipe of whole chestnuts cooked with cream and butter and seasoned with cinnamon is treated as a savory dish in 1844.

The Mont Blanc has three distinctive characteristics: it is sweet, it is made of chestnut purée in the form of vermicelli served as a mount or a ring, and it is heaped with whipped cream.

A sweet dessert of puréed chestnuts passed through a sieve to make vermicelli shapes—but without the characteristic whipped cream of the Mont Blanc—is referred to as (compote de) marrons en vermicelle in various French cookbooks starting in 1842.

A dish called entremets du Mont-Blanc or simply montblanc, described as a sweet combination of chestnuts and cream, is said to have been invented by the Dessat(s) pastry-shop by 1847. Sources do not specify exactly how it was prepared, but it was said to be "a true monument which will make his name immortal, that is, a dish that all mouths will praise".

An unambiguous reference to the Mont Blanc as a dish of puréed chestnuts topped with whipped cream is documented in 1885, called torche aux marrons, and considered an Alsatian dish. This recipe does not specify that the chestnuts are formed into vermicelli, but an 1892 article does, and clearly says that torche is the Alsatian name for what is called Mont Blanc in southern France. The same dish is also called marrons chantilly in 1889.

The dish with whipped cream and the name Mont-Blanc aux marrons appears in 1888, 1889, and 1893, and then in Escoffier's Guide Culinaire in 1903, with the advice to pile the whipped cream up irregularly to imitate a rugged mountain.

According to the Mont-Blanc (Monburan) pastry shop in Tokyo, Mont Blanc was introduced to Japan in 1933, inspired by the Mont Blanc of Angelina in Paris. That shop used chestnuts preserved in syrup, which were yellow.

It has been claimed that the dessert was described in Platina's De Honesta Voluptate in 1475, and that a recipe is found in Scappi's Opera in 1570, but no such recipe appears in these writings. It is also claimed that it arrived in France from Italy in 1620, but no evidence is given for this.

Preparation

Mont Blanc may be made from chestnuts cooked in a light syrup or in milk, or they may be cooked in plain water, and the sugar added afterwards. It may also be made with ready-made canned crème de marrons, a purée of the broken chestnuts left over from the manufacture of marrons glacés.

The chestnut purée is generally formed into a ring or cone, with big dollops of whipped cream dropped irregularly into or onto the middle, to resemble snow.

Variations

The chestnut purée may be formed in a mold rather than into vermicelli shapes, though this tends to make the dish heavier. This may be what was called "timbale de marrons, Chantilly" on an 1868 menu.

The original version served multiple diners, but the pâtisserie version today is often an individual serving.

In France, it is sometimes presented on a meringue or biscuit bottom. It may be flavored or garnished with chocolate, rose syrup, berries, and so on.

Variations include using chestnuts in the meringue or biscuit base, with no purée.

Escoffier also describes a Mont-Blanc aux fraises, essentially whipped cream studded with fraises des bois, with no chestnuts at all, the name referring to its shape.

A simplified version mixes crème de marrons with crème fraîche and serves it in a bowl, with no "mountain".

Traditional patisseries in Shanghai often have chestnut vermicelli cut into short bits, and laid atop a base of sponge cake, the thickness of which may vary. Shanghainese chestnut Mont Blanc also feature a heavy unwhipped cream topping and may be served in cups. Such style is said to have been created by a German pastry chef at the city's first European patisserie, Kaisiling, and over time it has become a Shanghainese staple under the unassuming name “li zi dan gao” or chestnut cake.

In Japan, sometimes pumpkin, squash, and purple yam are used instead of chestnuts, and along with chestnuts, sometimes cocoa or matcha are added. There are also fruit Mont Blanc, with flavors such as mango and strawberry. In fact, all they have in common with the original is being made of a purée formed into vermicelli shapes.

See also
 Marron glacé
 List of desserts

Notes

French desserts
Chestnut dishes